Levator muscle can refer to:
 Levator scapulae muscle
 Levator palpebrae superioris muscle
 Levator ani
 Levator labii superioris alaeque nasi muscle
 Levator veli palatini
 Levator muscle of thyroid gland
 Levator labii superioris
 Levator anguli oris